The Skating Club of New York is a figure skating club in New York City. It was founded in 1863 and is the second oldest skating club in the United States. It was one of the founding members of the United States Figure Skating Association.

Among the skaters who have represented the club in competition are U.S. national champions 
Scott Allen,
Sherwin Badger,
Jean-Pierre Brunet,
Jason Dungjen,
Harold Hartshorne,
Kyoko Ina,
Sonya Klopfer,
Robin Lee,
Beatrix Loughran,
Sandy MacDonald,
Rocky Marval,
Mark Militano,
Melissa Militano,
Marjorie Parker,
Donna Jeanne Pospisil,
Nettie Prantel,
Joseph Savage,
Yvonne Sherman,
Robert Swenning,
Johnny Weir,
Kathe Williams,
Elaine Zayak,
Adam Rippon,
Maia Shibutani, and
Alex Shibutani, plus Olympic champions Sarah Hughes, Carol Heiss, and Dorothy Hamill.

References

External links
 

1863 establishments in New York (state)
1860s in New York City
Figure skating clubs in the United States
Clubs and societies in New York City
Sports in New York City